Royal Arch Cascade is a waterfall located on the north wall of Yosemite Valley and the Yosemite National Park, United States, within walking distance from the Ahwahnee Hotel. The waterfall gets its name from its location immediately adjacent to the Royal Arches, which are a series of concentric semicircular setbacks in the cliff face directly opposite Glacier Point. The waterfall lacks a plunge pool and its flow is relatively gentle, making the base of the falls a popular photo spot.

References

External links 
 

Waterfalls of Yosemite National Park
Waterfalls of Mariposa County, California
Horsetail waterfalls